Allium parvum is an American species of wild onion known by the common name small onion. It is widespread in California, Nevada, Oregon and Idaho, and also reported from western Utah and from extreme southwestern Montana (Ravalli and Beaverhead Counties)

Allium parvum has a bulb one to two and a half centimeters wide and bears a relatively short scape for an onion species, rarely more than 12 centimeters tall. The two leaves are sickle-shaped. Atop the stem is an umbel of fewer than 30 flowers, which are generally pale pink with prominent dark midveins. Anthers are purple or yellow; pollen yellow.

Uses
This plant was a food and flavoring for the Paiute people.

References

External links
 Calflora Database: Allium parvum (Dwarf onion,  Small onion)
 USDA Plants Profile for Allium parvum (small onion)
UC CalPhotos of Allium parvum

parvum
Flora of California
Flora of Idaho
Flora of Montana
Flora of Nevada
Flora of Oregon
Flora of Utah
Flora of the Sierra Nevada (United States)
Onions
Plants described in 1863
Taxa named by Albert Kellogg
Flora without expected TNC conservation status